Several places have been given the nickname "Center (or Centre) of the Universe". In addition, several fictional works have described a depicted location as being at the Center of the Universe.

Modern models of the Universe suggest it does not have a center, unlike previous systems which placed Earth (geocentrism) or the Sun (heliocentrism) at the Center of the Universe.

Nicknames of places

Astronomy

  Centre of the Universe, the former interpretive centre at the Dominion Astrophysical Observatory in Saanich, British Columbia, Canada
  Naro Space Center, the only spaceport in South Korea
  Space Flight Operations Facility, the operations control center of the NASA Deep Space Network at the Jet Propulsion Laboratory in Pasadena, California
  Tanegashima Space Center, the main spaceport of Japan

Geography

Asia

China
 Wudaokou, Beijing

Europe

France
 Perpignan – Salvador Dalí considered its train station as the Center of the Universe.

Slovakia
 Monument, educational trail and geographical point referred to as "Center of the World and the Universe", created by local artists near Vrbové town.

United Kingdom
 Hammersmith – local historian Keith Whitehouse claimed it as the Centre of the Universe due to its history of radical politics and invention.
 Kirmington – home of Guy Martin referred to as ‘Center of T’ Universe’.
 Wolverhampton – Sir Terry Wogan referred to Wolverhampton as the Centre of the Universe because there, the bathwater goes straight down the plughole.

North America

Canada
 A site near Kamloops, British Columbia has been referred to as a spiritual "Centre of the Universe".
 Toronto, Ontario – a term used derisively by residents of the rest of Canada in reference to the city. See also: nicknames for Toronto.

Mexico
 Teotihuacan in modern-day Mexico – considered the Center of the Universe by many Mesoamerican tribes, including the Aztecs, and was a model city for the later indigenous civilizations. It was called the "birthplace of the gods" and heavily influenced the region despite being abandoned for centuries.

United States

 A concrete circle at the apex of a rebuilt span of the old Boston Avenue viaduct, between 1st and Archer Streets, in Tulsa, Oklahoma is known as "The Center of the Universe". The spot produces an acoustical anomaly and it is for which the Center of the Universe Festival and Ms. Center of the Universe Pageant are named.
 Albuquerque, New Mexico – a large sculpted-hallway structure with short corridors aligned to north-south, east-west, and up-down, at the main campus of the University of New Mexico is known as "The Center of the Universe".
 Alumni Hall (University of Notre Dame), South Bend, Indiana
 Ashland, Virginia – the actual, cosmological Center of the Universe, as declared by former Mayor Dick Gillis.
 Bon Aqua, Tennessee – referred to as the Center of the Universe by country singer Johnny Cash.
 César Chávez Park, Berkeley, California – more specifically, the sundial at the center of the park, located in the middle of the Bay Area.
 Epping, New Hampshire – bumper stickers sold at town hall state "Epping is the Center of the Universe" 
 Fremont, Seattle, Washington – a neighborhood in Seattle is the “official” Center of the Universe: sign at the Center of the Universe.
 John B. Lindale House in Magnolia, Delaware – displays a sign proclaiming "This is Magnolia, the Center of the Universe around which the Earth revolves".
 New York City
 Manhattan – often referred to as the Center of the Universe.
 Times Square
 Palm Court, New College of Florida in Sarasota, Florida – enshrined the Center of the Universe in 1965.
 Philo, Illinois – The legend "Center of the Universe" is painted on the village water tower, along with its zipcode.
 The center of the Great Dome on the campus of the Massachusetts Institute of Technology.
 Wallace, Idaho – declared by a mayoral proclamation to be the Center of the Universe based on the theory of probabilism: if you cannot prove that Wallace is not the Center of the Universe, then it must be the Center of the Universe. This philosophy was penned by journalist, David Bond, claiming it as a "spoof" highlighting the EPA's "unfalsifiable science of probabilism" in the declaration of the Silver Valley as a super-fund site.
 Three Rivers, Michigan – declared by the Three Rivers City Commission mainly based on a number of stories collected by a local resident of people from Three Rivers finding other people in unexpected places with connections to the Three Rivers area while they travel.

Oceania

Australia

 Glen Waverley, Melbourne, Victoria – nicknamed "The Centre of the Universe" by the local Chinese residents due to its convenient location, ample amenities, good weather, and favourable living conditions.

Fiction

Depictions of a "Center of the Universe" in fiction include:

 Any place other than The Restaurant at the End of the Universe in The Hitchhiker's Guide to the Galaxy series.
 Azathoth, "The Blind Idiot God", in H.P. Lovecraft's Cthulhu Mythos.
 Eternia, the planet that is home to the Masters of the Universe.
 In the game Ratchet & Clank Future: A Crack in Time for the PS3, The Great Clock was said to be constructed at the exact Center of the Universe (give or take fifty feet).
 In the game Super Mario Galaxy for the Wii, Mario travels to the final area, named the Center of the Universe.
 Nibbler's home planet Eternium, in Futurama.
 Oa, a planet at the center of the DC Comics Universe.
 San Dimas, California in Bill & Ted's Excellent Adventure.
 Terminus, in the Doctor Who serial Terminus.

See also 
 Center of the universe
 Earth's inner core
 Galactic Center
 Geographical centre of Earth
 Great Attractor
 History of the center of the Universe
 Sun – the center of the Solar System

References